Tru (also labeled Tru LP to differentiate it from the EP) is the fifth studio album by American singer Lloyd, released on August 31, 2018, by Young Goldie Music and Empire Distribution. The album follows up to his 2011 album King of Hearts and the 2016 EP of the same name.

Tru features guest appearances from Lil Wayne, Rick Ross, Sevyn Streeter, Khujo Goodie, Curren$y, The Spelman Women’s Choir and Lloyd’s infant son, River. The album has sold over 85,000 copies including single sales (Tru bringing in most of the sales). The single "Tru" was certified platinum by the RIAA.

Critical reception

Writing for Exclaim!, A. Harmony concluded that "While there are a few takeaways for hardcore Lloyd fans ("Tru" in particular), for others, there isn't much to hold on to".

Track listing

Charts

Release history

References

2018 albums
Lloyd (singer) albums
Empire Distribution albums
Albums produced by J.U.S.T.I.C.E. League